Lee Jong-min (born 1977) is a South Korean former professional tennis player.

Born in Seoul, Lee moved to Australia as an 11-year old to pursue a career in tennis and studied at Geelong College from 1993 to 1995. Locally he won national singles championships in both the 16s and 18s age groups, as well as finishing runner-up to Nicolas Kiefer at the 1995 Australian Open juniors. He won that year's Australian Open boys' doubles title (with Luke Bourgeois) and also claimed the 1995 US Open title (with Jocelyn Robichaud).

Lee represented South Korea in a 1996 Davis Cup tie against New Zealand in Seoul and featured mainly on the professional tour as a specialist doubles player, for which he attained a world ranking of 421.

From 1997 to 1999, Lee attended UC Santa Barbara, then from 1999 to 2000 he was at the University of California, Los Angeles. He was a two-time All-American tennis player for the UCLA Bruins.

See also
List of South Korea Davis Cup team representatives

References

External links
 
  (wrong birthdate & name spelling)
 

1977 births
Living people
South Korean male tennis players
Sportspeople from Seoul
Grand Slam (tennis) champions in boys' doubles
Australian Open (tennis) junior champions
US Open (tennis) junior champions
People educated at Geelong College
UC Santa Barbara Gauchos men's tennis players
UCLA Bruins men's tennis players
20th-century South Korean people